"Rise to It" is a song by the American hard rock band Kiss, released on the band's fifteenth studio album, Hot in the Shade in 1989. It is the opening track on the album and was released as the third and final single on April 1, 1990. However, it only charted on the Billboard Hot 100 and Mainstream Rock Tracks. The band only performed the song during the Hot in the Shade Tour. It is the final single by the band on which Eric Carr plays drums. He was diagnosed with terminal heart cancer following the supporting tour.

Background
The song, written by Paul Stanley, the band's vocalist/rhythm guitarist, and Bob Halligan Jr., starts with an acoustic intro, which has been compared to Cinderella's "Bad Seamstress Blues" by one review . The lyrics explore a singer's life of an unknown musician who claims that he will "rise to it". The story was re-told in a music video, where Stanley and Gene Simmons are seen in 1975 putting on make-up and talking about what would happen if they took the make-up off. Then, the song starts and the band is seen in 1989 playing in a club in a small crowd. The song was added to the setlist for the second show of the Hot in the Shade Tour and was performed until the end of the tour, but the band dropped the song from the setlist for the Revenge Tour and have never played the song again. The song was the lowest charting single off the album, reaching number 81 on Billboard Hot 100 and number 40 on Mainstream Rock. It  was the last Kiss single to chart on the Billboard Hot 100.

Music video
The music video, directed by Mark Rezyka, features Stanley and Simmons in their iconic makeup personas for the first time since the band's Creatures of the Night tour in 1982. The video's intro and epilogue scenes take place at the band's dressing room in 1975. While putting their makeup on, Stanley and Simmons debate about performing without the makeup. In the epilogue, as the band prepares for their show, Stanley states that no matter what changes, they will still be Kiss. The costumes used in these scenes are historically inaccurate; Simmons' costume is from the Unmasked (1980) era while Stanley's is from Love Gun (1977). In addition, Peter Criss and Ace Frehley are substituted with body doubles who are obviously Eric Carr and Bruce Kulick (who was wearing Vinnie Vincent’s “Ankh Warrior” costume).

Charts

Personnel
Paul Stanley – lead vocals, rhythm guitar
Gene Simmons – bass, backing vocals
Eric Carr – drums, backing vocals
Bruce Kulick – lead guitar, backing vocals

References 

Kiss (band) songs
1990 singles
Songs written by Paul Stanley
Songs written by Bob Halligan Jr.
American hard rock songs
1989 songs
Mercury Records singles